Lytham is a conurbation in the Borough of Fylde, Lancashire, England that includes the town of Lytham and the districts of Ansdell and Fairhaven.  It contains 91 buildings that are recorded in the National Heritage List for England as designated listed buildings.   Of these, one is listed at Grade I, the highest of the three grades, four are at Grade II*, the middle grade, and the others are at Grade II, the lowest grade.

Until the 19th century Lytham was a village and part of the estate of Lytham Hall, the seat of the Clifton family.  The earlier listed buildings consist mainly of the hall and the church, and associated structures, smaller houses and cottages, a farmhouse, and a windmill.  From the late 1830s the town began to develop as a seaside resort and commuter town, and larger houses overlooking the Green toward the estuary of the River Ribble were built.  The listed buildings from this time and later are varied and, in addition to larger houses, include hotels, public houses, shops, churches, a church hall, a market hall, public buildings such as institutes and libraries, memorials, and telephone kiosks.

Key

Buildings

References

Citations

Sources

Lists of listed buildings in Lancashire
Buildings and structures in the Borough of Fylde
Listed